A Arte de Amar Bem (also known as A Arte de Amar... Bem) it is a Brazilian comedy film released in 1970, in three episodes, directed by Fernando de Barros.

Plot theme

A sophisticated comedy movie Paulista, divided into three episodes taken from two pieces by Silveira Sampaio.

Cast
Eva Wilma
Raul Cortez
 Otelo Zeloni
 Consuelo Leandro
John Herbert
 Íris Bruzzi
 Newton Prado
 Luíza Di Franco
 Plínio Marcos
Sérgio Hingst
Wálter Forster
Karin Rodrigues
 Durval de Souza
 Diná Lisboa
 Vera Lúcia
 Luely Figueiró
 Gilda Medeiros

References

1970 films
1970 comedy films
Brazilian comedy films
1970s Portuguese-language films